Frank Harley (29 June 1895 – 14 December 1978) was an Australian rules footballer who played in the VFL between 1915 and 1917 and then from 1919 to 1925 for the Richmond Football Club.

Notes

References
 Hogan P: The Tigers Of Old, Richmond FC, Melbourne 1996

External links
 
 
 Frank Harley at Boylesfootballphotos.com

1895 births
1978 deaths
Australian rules footballers from Melbourne
Australian Rules footballers: place kick exponents
Richmond Football Club players
Richmond Football Club Premiership players
Leopold Football Club (MJFA) players
Two-time VFL/AFL Premiership players
People from Albert Park, Victoria